Ildikó Mincza-Nébald (born 6 December 1969, in Budapest) is a Hungarian épée fencer.

Mincza-Nébald won the bronze medal in the individual épée event at the 2008 Summer Olympic Games, losing the semi-final 14-15 to Ana Maria Brânză and winning 15-11 against Li Na in the play-off for third place. She was named Hungarian Sportswoman of the Year for this achievement.

Awards
 Hungarian Fencer of the Year (3): 1999, 2001, 2008
 Hungarian Sportswoman of the Year (1) - votes of sports journalists: 2008

Orders and special awards
   Order of Merit of the Republic of Hungary – Knight's Cross (2008)

References 

1969 births
Living people
Hungarian female épée fencers
Olympic bronze medalists for Hungary
Fencers at the 1992 Summer Olympics
Fencers at the 2000 Summer Olympics
Fencers at the 2004 Summer Olympics
Fencers at the 2008 Summer Olympics
Olympic fencers of Hungary
Martial artists from Budapest
Olympic medalists in fencing
Medalists at the 2008 Summer Olympics
Universiade medalists in fencing
Universiade gold medalists for Hungary
Medalists at the 1995 Summer Universiade
Medalists at the 1997 Summer Universiade
20th-century Hungarian women
21st-century Hungarian women